The 1892 Wimbledon Championships took place on the outdoor grass courts at the All England Lawn Tennis Club in Wimbledon, London, United Kingdom. The tournament ran from 27 June until 7 July. It was the 16th staging of the Wimbledon Championships, and the first Grand Slam tennis event of 1892. From this year, all events (singles and doubles) were played concurrently.

Champions

Men's singles

 Wilfred Baddeley defeated  Joshua Pim, 4–6, 6–3, 6–3, 6–2

Women's singles

 Lottie Dod defeated  Blanche Hillyard, 6–1, 6–1

Men's doubles

 Harry Barlow /  Ernest Lewis defeated  Herbert Baddeley /  Wilfred Baddeley, 4–6, 6–2, 8–6, 6–4

References

External links
 Official Wimbledon Championships website

 
Wimbledon Championships
Wimbledon Championships
Wimbledon Championships
June 1892 sports events
July 1892 sports events